Pukara (Aymara and Quechua for fortress, Hispanicized spelling Pucara) is a  mountain in the Andes of Bolivia. It is situated in the Oruro Department, Mejillones Province, Carangas Municipality, east of Carangas.

See also 
 P'isaqiri

References 

Mountains of Oruro Department